The Giffords Law Center to Prevent Gun Violence, previously known as the Legal Community Against Violence and the Law Center to Prevent Gun Violence, is a national public interest law center and nonprofit organization that promotes gun safety legislation in the United States and conducted litigation against the gun industry.  The Giffords Law Center publishes information about gun laws and gun control.  The organization offers legal assistance to public officials, and publishes research on gun laws and gun violence. The organization is currently led by former US Congresswoman Gabby Giffords.

The organization has been active in promoting gun control ordinances in California and elsewhere, as well as has conducted litigation to defend gun control laws against challenges.

History

The Legal Community Against Violence was established in the wake of the July 1, 1993 101 California Street shooting, during which a gunman entered the offices of law firm Petit & Martin and shot fourteen people, killing eight. Former Petit & Martin partners John Heisse and Chuck Erlich formed the nonprofit organization shortly after the shooting to help local communities pass their own gun control ordinances.

Initially focusing on the local regulation of firearms in California, LCAV supported the passage of the Brady Bill and the national assault weapons ban in 1993. The organization’s volunteer lawyers provided legal consultation to the city of West Hollywood when it was sued by the National Rifle Association in January 1996 for banning Saturday Night Special handguns. The lawsuit was dismissed in November 1996.

In 2016, Legal Community Against Violence merged with Americans for Responsible Solutions, led by former Congresswoman Gabby Giffords and Navy combat veteran and retired NASA astronaut Captain Mark Kelly. The organization changed its name to Giffords Law Center to Prevent Gun Violence in 2017.

In 2019, Giffords Law Center sued the Federal Election Commission, alleging the regulatory agency failed to take action against the National Rifle Association for alleged campaign finance violations. The lawsuit, filed by Giffords and the Campaign Legal Center, states the FEC did not respond to multiple complaints accusing the NRA of using shell organizations to donate more than the legal amount to the campaigns of President Trump and six Republican Senate candidates. In response, the NRA stated “[t]his latest effort by Giffords and the Campaign Legal Center is a frivolous lawsuit based on a frivolous complaint.”

Following the FEC's lack of respose, the Giffords Law Center filed a federal lawsuit directly against the National Rifle Association in November 2021.

Reports and state rankings
Giffords Law Center provides comparisons of state gun laws online, and annually releases the Gun Law Scorecard, a report that ranks and measures individual states’ gun death rates in correlation to their gun laws. According to the organization, its research shows there are fewer gun deaths in states with strict gun laws.

See also
Giffords
Gabby Giffords
Gun violence in the United States

References

External links
 

Civil liberties advocacy groups in the United States
Gun control advocacy groups in the United States
Legal advocacy organizations in the United States